Gordon Hunt was the solo oboist in The Philhamonia Orchestra. He is a conductor, a professor at the Guildhall School of Music and Drama and an Honorary Associate of the Royal Academy of Music.

Academic history
Gordon Hunt studied under Terence MacDonagh, and is now a professor at the Guildhall School of Music and Drama and an Honorary Associate of the Royal Academy of Music.

Musical career
He has had a professional career as both a soloist, conductor, and as principal oboist of the Philharmonia Orchestra.  Hunt has held principal positions at the London Philharmonic and the London Chamber Orchestra.  He has played as Guest Principal with the Berlin Philharmonic, and worked under many leading conductors, including Vladimir Ashkenazy, Simon Rattle, Riccardo Muti, and Andrew Davis.

Hunt was Music Director of the Swedish Chamber Winds from 1991–1997, and has worked with orchestras and wind ensembles across the continents.  He was Artistic Director of the Danish Chamber Players from 2001–2004, and now works regularly with the Danish National Chamber Orchestra.

Notability

He played at the wedding of Prince Charles and Camilla Parker Bowles in the Summer of 2005.

Hunt has made several CD recordings, from which tracks are regularly broadcast on Classic FM (UK) and other radio stations.

Discography 
 Elevazione, 2002
 Soliloquy, 1998
 Britten, Bax, Bliss, 1997

References 
 Hunt's Website

English classical oboists
Male oboists
Year of birth missing (living people)
Living people
Place of birth missing (living people)